The Turbomeca Astazou is a highly successful series of turboprop and turboshaft engines, first run in 1957. It was admitted for aviation service on May 29, 1961, after a 150-hour test run. The main developing engineer was G. Sporer. It was named after two summits of the Pyrenees.

A simplified version was built by Agusta as the Turbomeca-Agusta TA.230.

Design and development

The Astazou IIA version was derived from the original Astazou powerplant for use in helicopters. By 1993, 2,200 had been built. As of 2007, it was still in production. However, many aircraft initially equipped with it, especially the heavier ones, have since been upgraded with more powerful engines.

The early single-shaft Astazou has a two-stage compressor, with the first stage an axial and the second stage a radial design. It has an annular combustion chamber, after which the combustion gases enter a three-stage axial turbine.

Engines have a reduction gearbox in front of the air inlet, with an output speed suitable for a propeller or, for helicopters, as the first stage only of the much bigger reduction required for a rotor. Fuel to the gas generator is adjusted automatically to maintain a constant propeller or rotor speed as blade pitch varies.

As of the Astazou X, the engine received a second axial compressor stage. This was the engine for the Potez 840. The Astazou XIV and XVI were also marketed by Rolls-Royce Turboméca International Ltd under the names AZ14 and AZ16, respectively.

Power was steadily increased over the years, with the Eurocopter Dauphin's dual Astazou XVIII developing 783 kW each. The XXB derivative, used in the single engine Aérospatiale SA 361H Dauphin, delivered .

Variants
Astazou I
Astazou IISingle-stage axial plus single-stage centrifugal compressor, annular combustor, three-stage turbine
Astazou IIA
Astazou III
Astazou IIIA
Astazou IIIC
Astazou IIIC2
Astazou IIIN
Astazou IIIN2
Astazou VICoupled Astazou 
Astazou XThe X and subsequent engines had a second axial compressor stage added.
Astazou XII
Astazou XIVTwo-stage axial plus single-stage centrifugal compressor, annular combustor, three-stage turbine. Integral front mounted
gearbox.
Astazou XIVA
Astazou XIVB
Astazou XIVD
Astazou XIVC
Astazou XIVH
Astazou XIVM
Astazou XVI
Astazou XVIG
Astazou XVIII
Astazou XVIIIA
Astazou XXA third axial compressor stage added for increased pressure ratio.
Astazou XXB
Turbomeca-Agusta TA.230(aka TAA-230)A simplified version built by Agusta.
Rolls-Royce Turboméca AZ14 The Astazou XIV marketed by Rolls-Royce Turboméca International Ltd as the AZ14
Rolls-Royce Turboméca AZ16 The Astazou XVI marketed by Rolls-Royce Turboméca International Ltd as the AZ16

Applications

Fixed-wing aircraft
 Dassault Communauté
 Dassault MD320 Hirondelle 2x Astazou XIV  equivalent.
 Dornier Do27T-l 2x Astazou II  equivalent.
 FMA IA 58 Pucará 2x Astazou XVIG  equivalent.
 Handley Page HP.137 Jetstream 2x Astazou XIVC  equivalent.
 Mitsubishi MU-2
 Nord Noralpha
 Pilatus PC-6/A1-H2 Turbo Porter lx Astazou XII  equivalent.
 Potez 840 4x 440shp (328 kW) Turboméca Astazou II 
 Potez 842 4x  600shp (447 kW) Turboméca Astazou XII
 SFERMA Nord 1110
 SFERMA SF-60 Marquis 2x Astazou X
 SFERMA PD-146 Marquis 2x Astazou IIA
 Short SC.7 Skyvan series II 2x Astazou XII  equivalent.
 SIPA S-2510 Antilope
 IAI Arava 2x Astazou XIV  equivalent.
 UV-23A Dominion Skytrader 2x Turboméca Astazou XIV

Helicopters
 Aérospatiale SA.319B Alouette III 1x Astazou XIVB .
 Aérospatiale Gazelle 1x Astazou IIIN  equivalent.
 Aérospatiale Gazelle AH.1 1x Astazou IIIN2
 Agusta A.105
 Agusta A.106
 Agusta A.115
 Aérospatiale SA 360 Dauphin
 Dechaux Helicop-Jet 1x Astazou II

Specifications (Astazou XVI)

See also

References

Further reading

 

Astazou
1950s turboprop engines
1950s turboshaft engines